The 1951 German football championship was the culmination of the football season in the West Germany in 1950–51. 1. FC Kaiserslautern were crowned champions for the first time after a group stage and a final.

Qualified teams
The teams qualified through the 1950–51 Oberliga season:

Competition

Group 1

Group 2

Final

References

External links
 1950-51 at Weltfussball.de
 Germany - Championship 1951 at RSSSF.com
 German championship 1951 at Fussballdaten.de

West
German football championship seasons